Collinston is an unincorporated community on the northeastern edge of Box Elder County, Utah, United States.

Description

Its elevation is 4,432 feet (1,351 m). It has a post office with the ZIP code 84306.

Collinston is mentioned as the approximate location where Captain John C. Frémont crossed the Bear River in 1843.

The town was originally known as Hampton or Hampton Ford. It was named for Ben Hampton, who, with William Godbe, operated a toll ferry across the Bear River from 1867 to 1868. The name was changed to Collinston, after Utah Northern Railroad conductor Collins Fulmer.

See also

References

External links

Unincorporated communities in Box Elder County, Utah
Unincorporated communities in Utah
Populated places established in 1867